Brittany Hudak (born June 2, 1993) is a Canadian biathlete and cross-country skier.

Early life
Hudak was born in Prince Albert, Saskatchewan with only one arm.  She grew up participating in cross-country running and track and field.  In 2011, at the age of 18, she was introduced to the sport and Paralympics by a former Paralympian 2014 teammate Colette Bourgonje.  She never heard of the sport of Paralympic Nordic skiing.  Hudak was told about the opportunity to compete against other disabled athletes on a more level playing field.  She acknowledged that it wasn't easy at first, but was intrigued enough to keep going.  She started out competing in Saskatchewan.

Career
In 2014, after only two-years in the sport, she beat one other athlete for a spot on Team Canada for the 2014 Winter Paralympics in Sochi, Russia.  Hudak was 2014-15 World Cup Overall Cross-Country Champion.  In December 2017, as part of Team Canada, she won bronze at the para-Nordic World Cup.  In 2019, at the 13th World Para Nordic Skiing Championships in Prince George, British Columbia, she won silver in the mixed relay.

At the 2018 Winter Paralympics, she won a bronze medal in the women's 12.5 kilometres biathlon event, which was her first Paralympic medal in her career.

During the 2021-2022 World Para Nordic Skiing World Cup season in December 2021, it made a stop in Canmore, Alberta. Hudak won for four gold and a silver.  She won two golds and a silver in women's standing cross-country and two golds in biathlon.

At the 2022 Winter Paralympics, Hudak captured her first medal of the games by winning bronze in the 15 km classical standing.

References

External links 
 
 

1993 births
Living people
Canadian female cross-country skiers
Canadian female biathletes
Paralympic cross-country skiers of Canada
Paralympic biathletes of Canada
Paralympic bronze medalists for Canada
Medalists at the 2018 Winter Paralympics
Cross-country skiers at the 2018 Winter Paralympics
Biathletes at the 2018 Winter Paralympics
Sportspeople from Prince Albert, Saskatchewan
Paralympic medalists in biathlon
Biathletes at the 2014 Winter Paralympics
Cross-country skiers at the 2022 Winter Paralympics
Medalists at the 2022 Winter Paralympics
21st-century Canadian women